Ricardo Araujo (born July 20, 1978) is a Colombian pianist, composer and conductor. Araujo was born in 1978 in Bogotá (Colombia).

Early life 
Araujo evolved in the abstract universe of painting and music. He began his musical studies in 1989 with pianist Lile Tiempo and in 1990, as Marie-Louise Toupouzien's student. Ricardo was awarded by Belgium Superior Jury in the excellence category. At age 12, he gave his first piano recital in Brussels, playing Bach and Mozart. Seven months later, he made his debut with Brussels' Royal Conservatoire chamber orchestra, when Martha Argerich noticed him.

In 1991, back in Colombia, he simultaneously went on with his pianist, music director and composer training. He quickly became Dimitr Manolov's assistant, then second music director of the Colombia Symphony Orchestra.
Before leaving Colombia in February 1998 to settle in Paris, Ricardo Araujo chose to dedicate himself exclusively to music writing and orchestras' direction.

Career 
Araujo has favoured reflexion and search for a union between the composer's thoughts and his own identity. Through the years, he has tended to put aside immediate virtuosity in favour of discovering colours and thoughts in order to modernize works.

Since 1993, Araujo has given many concerts in Latin America:  Bogotá, Caracas, Vina del Mar, Santiago, Buenos Aires, as well as in Europe: Brussels, Namur, Paris, Chartres, Dijon, Vienna, Bonn, Dresden, Bamberg, Nuremberg, Lausanne, London, Rome, etc.
 
As a conductor and besides his part in the Colombia Symphony Orchestra, he was in charge of creating several works during the 1997 Bogotá Contemporary Music Festival. He then has directed Mozart concertos from his piano with Rome's Santa Cecilia Orchestra.

Araujo has worked with keys figures such as Michel Merlet, Vladimir Ashkenazy, Marek Janowski, Henri Dutilleux and Mstislav Rostropovitch.  He has performed in Royal Conservatory of Brussels, Caracas Teatro Teresa Carreno, Municipal Theatre of Santiago, Buenos Aires Teatro Colón, in Paris Salle Cortot, Bamberg Symphony, Lausanne Salle Metropole, Konzerthaus, Vienna, etc.
He has directed Colombia Symphony Orchestra since 1996, and since 1998, Paris Opera Orchestra, Stuttgart Radio-Sinfonieorchester, Bayerische Staatsphilarmonie and many more. In 2003, he became William Christie's assistant during the Paris National Opera creation of J.P. Rameau's Boréades and then, Armin Jordan's with a new interpretation of Mozart Così fan tutte. The very same year, he has been invited to play two recitals in Colombia. Both have been unanimously greeted by the national press. Since February 2004, he has been a regular guest at Paris Cercle de l'Union Interallié.

In March 2005, he was named as musical director of Cartagena de Indias New Opera and Festival, and has been in charge of musical programming.

As a composer, some of his works came into being during events such as Colombia Contemporary music festival in Bogota, or Gerberoy festival in France. Some of the interpreters were Eduardo Herrera, Oscar Hernandez, Dimitr Manolov, and Anne-Julie Kerkhello.

In 2001, he has worked for the IRCAM, when he composed two works of electronic music which would be re-arranged for symphony orchestra afterwards.

In 2007, willing to gather Latin American young talents, he has founded with the help of Latin American diplomatic missions the New Latin American Philharmonic Orchestra and became its musical director. Under his influence, the Orchestra has aimed to promote his continent symphonic repertoire.

References

External links 
 Ricardo Araujo
 New Latin American Philharmonic Orchestra

1978 births
Colombian composers
Colombian musicians
Living people
Musicians from Bogotá
Colombian pianists
21st-century pianists